Methylene (IUPAC name: Methylidene, also called carbene or methene) is an organic compound with the chemical formula  (also written ). It is a colourless gas that fluoresces in the mid-infrared range, and only persists in dilution, or as an adduct.

Methylene is the simplest carbene. It is usually detected only at very low temperatures, or as a short-lived intermediate in chemical reactions.

Nomenclature 
The trivial name carbene is the preferred IUPAC name. The systematic names methylidene and dihydridocarbon, valid IUPAC names, are constructed according to the substitutive and additive nomenclatures, respectively.

Methylidene is viewed as methane with two hydrogen atoms removed. By default, this name pays no regard to the radicality of the methylene. Although in a context where the radicality is considered, it can also name the non-radical excited state, whereas the radical ground state with two unpaired electrons is named methanediyl.

Methylene is also used as the trivial name for the substituent groups methanediyl, and methylidene.

Methylene has an electron affinity of 0.65 eV.

Discovery and preparation 
Using the technique of flash photolysis with the compound diazomethane, 
Gerhard Herzberg and Jack Shoosmith 
were the first to 
produce and spectroscopically characterize the methylene molecule. In their work they obtained
the ultraviolet spectrum of gas phase methylene at around 141.5 nm. Their
analysis of the spectrum lead them to the conclusion that the ground electronic state was an 
electronic triplet state and that the equilibrium structure was either linear, or else it had 
a large bond angle of about 140°. It turns out that the latter is correct. The reactions of methylene were also studied around 1960, by infrared spectroscopy in frozen gas matrix isolation experiments.

Methylene can be prepared, under suitable conditions, by decomposition of compounds with a methylidene or methanediyl group, such as ketene (ethenone) (=CO), diazomethane (linear =), diazirine (cyclic [--N=N-]) and diiodomethane (I--I). The decomposition can be effected by photolysis, photosensitized reagents (such as benzophenone), or thermal decomposition.

The methylene molecule (CH2) was mentioned for the first time by Donald Duck in a comic in 1944.

Chemical properties

Radicality 
Many of methylene's electronic states lie relatively close to each other, giving rise to varying degrees of radical chemistry. The ground state is a triplet radical with two unpaired electrons (X̃3B1), and the first excited state is a singlet non-radical (ã1A1). With the singlet non-radical only 38 kJ above the ground state, a sample of methylene exists as a mixture of electronic states even at room temperature, giving rise to complex reactions. For example, reactions of the triplet radical with non-radical species generally involves abstraction, whereas reactions of the singlet non-radical not only involves abstraction, but also insertion or addition.
2•(X̃3B1) +  → • + [HO]•
(ã1A1) +  →  +  or 
The singlet state is also more stereospecific than the triplet.

Unsolvated methylene will spontaneously autopolymerise to form various excited oligomers, the simplest of which, is the excited form of the alkene ethylene. The excited oligomers, decompose rather than decay to a ground state. For example, the excited form of ethylene decomposes to acetylene and atomic hydrogen.
2  →  → HCCH + 2 H

Unsolvated, excited methylene will form stable ground state oligomers.
2  →

Structure 

The ground state of methylene has an ionisation energy of 10.396 eV. It has a bent configuration, with H-C-H angle of 133.84°, and is thus paramagnetic. (The correct prediction of this angle was an early success of ab initio quantum chemistry.) However conversion to a linear configuration requires only 5.5 kcal/mol.

The singlet state has a slightly higher energy (by about 9 kcal/mol) than the triplet state, and its H-C-H angle is smaller, about 102°. In dilute mixtures with an inert gas, the two states will convert to each other until reaching an equilibrium.

Chemical reactions

Organic chemistry 
Neutral methylene complexes undergo different chemical reactions depending on the pi character of the coordinate bond to the carbon centre. A weak contribution, such as in diazomethane, yields mainly substitution reactions, whereas a strong contribution, such as in ethenone, yields mainly addition reactions. Upon treatment with a standard base, complexes with a weak contribution convert to a metal methoxide. With strong acids (e.g., fluorosulfuric acid), they can be protonated to give . Oxidation of these complexes yields formaldehyde, and reduction yields methane.

Free methylene undergoes the typical chemical reactions of a carbene. Addition reactions are very fast and exothermic.

When the methylene molecule is in its state of lowest energy, the unpaired valence electrons are in separate atomic orbitals with independent spins, a configuration known as triplet state.

Methylene may gain an electron yielding a monovalent anion methanidyl, which can be obtained as the trimethylammonium (()4) salt by the reaction of phenyl sodium with trimethylammonium bromide (()4). The ion has bent geometry, with a H-C-H angle of about 103°.

Reactions with inorganic compounds 
Methylene is also a common ligand in coordination compounds, such as copper methylene .

Methylene can bond as a terminal ligand, which is called methylidene, or as a bridging ligand, which is called methanediyl.

See also 
Methyl radical
Methylidyne radical
Atomic carbon
Alkene
Methylene group

References

Carbenes
Organic chemistry
Free radicals